Peter B. Warr is a British occupational psychologist.

Life
Warr was awarded a BA from the University of Cambridge followed by a PhD from the University of Sheffield.  He spent the majority of his academic career at Sheffield. With Harry Kay he established Social and Applied Psychology Unit of which he became Director.  The unit combined with the Institute of Work Psychology from which Warr retired as Emeritus Professor.

Work
He has researched extensively on various aspect of occupational psychology.  In particular, he has contributed substantially to understanding of  worker happiness and unhappiness.

Awards
 Spearman Medal, British Psychological Society for distinguished research
 President's Award, British Psychological Society for outstanding contributions to psychological knowledge
 1999 - Honorary Fellow, British Psychological Society
 Fellow, International Association of Applied Psychology
 Fellow, Society of Industrial and Organizational Psychology

Publications
 Warr, P. B. (2019). The Psychology of Happiness. Oxford: Routledge.
 Warr, P. and Clapperton, G. (2009). The Joy of Work? Jobs, Happiness, and You. London: Routledge.
 Warr, P. B. (2007). Work, Happiness, and Unhappiness. New York: Routledge.

References

Organizational psychologists
20th-century British scientists
21st-century British scientists
British psychologists
Living people
Academics of the University of Sheffield
Year of birth missing (living people)